Four Ways to Forgiveness is a collection of four short stories and novellas by American writer Ursula K. Le Guin.  All four stories are set in the future and deal with the planets Yeowe and Werel, both members of the Ekumen, a collective of planets used by Le Guin as part of the background for many novels and short stories in her Hainish Cycle. In 2017 it was reissued in the second volume of Hainish Novels & Stories and as an e-book, augmented with a fifth related story by Le Guin, as Five Ways to Forgiveness.

Setting

The stories in the book are set on two planets in a distant solar system, Werel and Yeowe, inhabited by humans placed there by the ancient Hainish. (This 'Werel' is not the same as the world called Werel in Le Guin's Planet of Exile and City of Illusions.) Werel has a long history of institutional enslavement of its lighter-skinned ethnic groups by its darker-skinned ethnic groups (the latter's derogatory term for the former is "dusties"). When the Ekumen recontacted the Werelians, the shock spurred one of the Werelian nations, Voe Deo, to develop a space program and settle the other inhabitable planet in the system, Yeowe, transporting a primarily slave population to do so. Eventually the slaves on Yeowe conducted a successful revolt and gained their independence, an event that occurred in the fairly recent past of the four stories. The nations of Werel are nervous that the "assets" on that planet might attempt the same thing for themselves.

Contents

"Betrayals" - The story of Yoss, an elderly, retired science teacher who lived through Yeowe's War of Liberation, and her neighbour Chief Abberkam, a disgraced leader from that war and an opponent of contact with the Ekumen, both living in a desolate area of the planet. Abberkam rescues Yoss's pet cat from an accidental fire which destroys her hut; Yoss then moves into Abberkam's house. 
"Forgiveness Day" - Solly, a woman of half-Terran ancestry and space-travelling parents, faces problems as Envoy to the small sexually repressive kingdom of Gatay on Werel.
"A Man of the People" - Havzhiva is a man who grows up on Hain, is educated there and then works for the Hainish embassy on Yeowe.  It contains the most extensive description of Hain's environment and culture in Le Guin's work.
"A Woman's Liberation" - Rakam, a woman born as a slave on Werel, tells of her life and her growing self-awareness. Also published in the anthology  A Woman's Liberation: A Choice of Futures By and About Women (2001).
"Old Music and the Slave Women"* focuses on Esdardon Aya, also known as 'Old Music'. It is set somewhat later in time than the other four stories. Le Guin writes, "the character called Old Music began to tell me a fifth tale about the latter days of the civil war . . . I’m glad to see it joined to the others at last."* Only in Five Ways to Forgiveness, not Four Ways...; published earlier in the collection The Birthday of the World.

The second, third, fourth, and fifth stories have some characters in common.  Havzhiva from story #3 works for Solly from #2.  He is also the lover of Rakam in #4, who is mentioned but not named in #3.  Both of them know Dr Yeron, and also Esdardon Aya, 'Old Music'. 'Old Music' is a minor character in #2, and the protagonist in #5.

The book ends with "Notes on Werel and Yeowe", giving details of the two planets and their solar system.

Themes
The common themes of the stories revolve around the concepts of freedom and slavery. For thousands of years, the dark-skinned owners of Werel held the light-skinned assets in slavery. However, in recent years, following the colonization of the second planet, Yeowe, things have begun to change on Werel. The Yeowans have gained freedom and are struggling to establish their own government and identity, and gain admittance into the Ekumen of worlds.

Gender relations are another area examined by the stories. In its initial years of settlement, only male slaves were transported to Yeowe, leading to a hypermasculine culture and formalized homosexual relationships among them, both of which had a strong impact on later gender relations on Yeowe. In the second story of the book, Solly associates with a Werelian member of a class of traditional transvestite entertainers, and the fourth story features Rakam reflecting on how her new experience of freedom from formal slavery is conditioned by her position as a woman in a still-sexist society.

Publication history
The collection was first published by Harper Paperbacks (a division of HarperCollins Publishers) in 1995.  Betrayals first appeared in 1994 in Blue Motel. The others appeared in the science fiction magazine Asimov's in 1994 and 1995.

Four Ways to Forgiveness was published in 1995 in a leather-bound, signed edition by Easton Press, who describe themselves as releasing 'works of lasting meaning, beauty and importance.'

Five Ways to Forgiveness was published in 2017 by Library of America eBook Classics, in e-book format only. The Library of America included Five Ways to Forgiveness in the collection Hainish Novels & Stories, Volume Two as well.

Reception and critical analysis
Four Ways to Forgiveness has been referred to as a story-suite by critics, based on Le Guin's own use of the term to describe her deliberate inclusion of linked short stories in book form.  Le Guin has remarked that the collections of stories could have been a novel had she focused on a few characters; instead she decided to focus on a work with many voices.

References

External links
 
 

1995 short story collections
Short story collections by Ursula K. Le Guin
Hainish Cycle
HarperCollins books
Novels set on fictional planets
1990s science fiction works